Hylodes vanzolinii is a species of frogs in the family Hylodidae.

Geographic range
H. vanzolinii is endemic to Brazil and only known from its type locality, Caparaó National Park in the Minas Gerais state.

Habitat
The natural habitat of H. vanzolinii is open high-altitude grassland near streams.

Conservation status
The main threats to H. vanzolinii are habitat loss, caused by fires, and tourism.

Etymology
The specific name vanzolinii honors Paulo Vanzolini, a Brazilian herpetologist and composer.

References

vanzolinii
Endemic fauna of Brazil
Amphibians of Brazil
Amphibians described in 1982
Taxonomy articles created by Polbot